Zahid Shah (born June 8, 1980) is Pakistani-born cricketer who played for the United Arab Emirates national cricket team. He also plays for the North-West Frontier Province. He is a Right-arm fast-medium bowler.

Shah made his ODI debut against Bangladesh in the 2008 Asia Cup. He took six wickets in the tournament.

References

External links

1980 births
Living people
United Arab Emirates One Day International cricketers
Cricketers from Peshawar
Pakistani emigrants to the United Arab Emirates
Pakistani expatriate sportspeople in the United Arab Emirates
Peshawar cricketers
Pakistani cricketers
Emirati cricketers